Alpha cutoff frequency, or  is the frequency at which the common base DC current gain  drops to 0.707 of its low frequency value.

References

Transistors